Belarusian is an East Slavic language. It is the native language of the Belarusians and one of the two official state languages in Belarus, alongside Russian. Additionally, it is spoken in some parts of Russia, Lithuania, Latvia, Poland, and Ukraine by Belarusian minorities in those countries.

Before Belarus gained independence in 1991, the language was known in English as Byelorussian or Belorussian, or alternatively as White Russian. Following independence, it became known as Belarusian, or alternatively as Belarusan.

As one of the East Slavic languages, Belarusian shares many grammatical and lexical features with other members of the group. To some extent, Russian, Rusyn, Ukrainian, and Belarusian retain a degree of mutual intelligibility. Its predecessor stage is known in Western academia as Ruthenian (14th to 17th centuries), in turn descended from what is referred to in modern linguistics as Old East Slavic (10th to 13th centuries).

In the first Belarus Census of 1999, the Belarusian language was declared as a "language spoken at home" by about 3,686,000 Belarusian citizens (36.7% of the population). About 6,984,000 (85.6%) of Belarusians declared it their "mother tongue". Other sources, such as Ethnologue, put the figure at approximately  million active speakers in Belarus. According to a study done by the Belarusian government in 2009, 72% of Belarusians speak Russian at home, while Belarusian is actively used by only 11.9% of Belarusians (others speak a mixture of Russian and Belarusian, known as Trasianka). Approximately 29.4% of Belarusians can write, speak, and read Belarusian, while 52.5% can only read and speak it. In the UNESCO Atlas of the World's Languages in Danger, the Belarusian language is stated to be vulnerable.

Names 
There are a number of names under which the Belarusian language has been known, both contemporary and historical. Some of the most dissimilar are from the Old Belarusian period.

Official, romanised 
 Belarusian (also spelled Belarusan, (Belarussian) – derived from the name of the country "Belarus", officially approved for use abroad by the Belarusian MFA and promoted since then.

Historical 
 Byelorussian (also spelled Belorussian, Bielorussian) – derived from the Russian-language name of the country "Byelorussia", used officially (in the Russian language) in the times of the USSR (1922–1991) and, later, in the Russian Federation.
 White Russian or White Ruthenian (and its equivalents in other languages) – literally, a word-by-word translation of the parts of the composite word Belarusian. The term "White Ruthenian" with reference to language has appeared in English-language texts since at least 1921.

Alternative 
 Great Lithuanian – proposed and used by Yan Stankyevich since the 1960s, intended to part with the "diminishing tradition of having the name related to the Muscovite tradition of calling the Belarusian lands" and to pertain to the "great tradition of Belarusian statehood".
 Kryvian or Krivian – derived from the name of the Slavonic tribe Krivichi, one of the main tribes in the foundations of the forming of the Belarusian nation. Created and used in the 19th century by Belarusian Polish-speaking writers Jaroszewicz, Narbut, Rogalski, Jan Czeczot. Strongly promoted by Vacłaŭ Łastoŭski.

Vernacular 
 Simple or local – used mainly in times preceding the common recognition of the existence of the Belarusian language, and nation in general. Supposedly, the term can still be encountered up to the end of the 1930s, e.g., in Western Belarus. It is widely used to this day in Pomerania in reference to the mixed Polish-Belarusian dialects spoken there.
 Simple Black Ruthenian – used in the beginning of the 19th century by the Russian researcher Baranovski and attributed to contemporary vernacular Belarusian.

Phonology 

Although closely related to other East Slavic languages, especially Ukrainian, Belarusian phonology is distinct in a number of ways. The phoneme inventory of the modern Belarusian language consists of 45 to 54 phonemes: 6 vowels and 39 to 48 consonants, depending on how they are counted. When the nine geminate consonants are excluded as mere variations, there are 39 consonants, and excluding rare consonants further decreases the count. The number 48 includes all consonant sounds, including variations and rare sounds, which may be phonetically distinct in the modern Belarusian language.

Alphabet 

The Belarusian alphabet is a variant of the Cyrillic script, which was first used as an alphabet for the Old Church Slavonic language. The modern Belarusian form was defined in 1918, and consists of thirty-two letters. Before that, Belarusian had also been written in the Belarusian Latin alphabet (Łacinka / Лацінка), the Belarusian Arabic alphabet (by Lipka Tatars) and the Hebrew alphabet (by Belarusian Jews). The Glagolitic script was used, sporadically, until the 11th or 12th century.

There are several systems of romanizing (transliterating) written Belarusian texts; see Romanization of Belarusian. The Belarusian Latin alphabet is rarely used.

Grammar 

Standardized Belarusian grammar in its modern form was adopted in 1959, with minor amendments in 1985 and 2008. It was developed from the initial form set down by Branisłaŭ Taraškievič (first printed in Vilnius, 1918), and it is mainly based on the Belarusian folk dialects of Minsk-Vilnius region. Historically, there have been several other alternative standardized forms of Belarusian grammar.

Belarusian grammar is mostly synthetic and partly analytic, and overall quite similar to Russian grammar. Belarusian orthography, however, differs significantly from Russian orthography in some respects, due to the fact that it is a phonetic orthography that closely represents the surface phonology, whereas Russian orthography represents the underlying morphophonology.

The most significant instance of this is found in the representation of vowel reduction, and in particular akanje, the merger of unstressed /a/ and /o/, which exists in both Russian and Belarusian. This can significantly complicate the foreign speakers' task of learning these paradigms; on the other hand, though, it makes spelling easier for native speakers.

An example illustrating the contrast between the treatment of akanje in Russian and Belarusian orthography is the spelling of the word for “products; food”:
 In Ukrainian: продукти (pronounced “produkty”, IPA: [proˈduktɪ])
 In Russian: продукты (pronounced “pradukty”, IPA: [prɐˈduktɨ])
 In Belarusian: прадукты (pronounced “pradukty”, IPA: [praˈduktɨ])

Dialects 

Besides the standardized lect, there are two main dialects of the Belarusian language, the North-Eastern and the South-Western. In addition, there is a transitional Middle Belarusian dialect group and the separate West Polesian dialect group.

The North-Eastern and the South-Western dialects are separated by a hypothetical line Ashmyany–Minsk–Babruysk–Homyel, with the area of the Middle Belarusian dialect group placed on and along this line.

The North-Eastern dialect is chiefly characterized by the "soft sounding R" and "strong akanye", and the South-Western dialect is chiefly characterized by the "hard sounding R" and "moderate akanye".

The West Polesian dialect group is separated from the rest of the country by the conventional line Pruzhany–Ivatsevichy–Telekhany–Luninyets–Stolin.

Classification and relationship to other languages
There is a high degree of mutual intelligibility among the Belarusian, Russian, and Ukrainian languages.

Within East Slavic, the Belarusian language is most closely related to Ukrainian.

History

The modern Belarusian language was redeveloped on the base of the vernacular spoken remnants of the Ruthenian language, surviving in the ethnic Belarusian territories in the 19th century. The end of the 18th century (the times of the Divisions of Commonwealth) is the usual conventional borderline between the Ruthenian and Modern Belarusian stages of development.

By the end of the 18th century, (Old) Belarusian was still common among the minor nobility in eastern part, in the territory of present-day Belarus, of the Grand Duchy of Lithuania (hereafter GDL). Jan Czeczot in the 1840s had mentioned that even his generation's grandfathers preferred speaking (Old) Belarusian. According to A. N. Pypin, the Belarusian language was spoken in some areas among the minor nobility during the 19th century. In its vernacular form, it was the language of the smaller town dwellers and of the peasantry and it had been the language of oral folklore. Teaching in Belarusian was conducted mainly in schools run by the Basilian order.

The development of Belarusian in the 19th century was strongly influenced by the political conflict in the territories of the former GDL, between the Russian Imperial authorities, trying to consolidate their rule over the "joined provinces", and the Polish and Polonized nobility, trying to bring back its pre-Partitions rule (see also Polonization in times of Partitions).

 One of the important manifestations of this conflict was the struggle for ideological control over the educational system. The Polish and Russian languages were being introduced and re-introduced, while the general state of the people's education remained poor until the very end of the Russian Empire.

In summary, the first two decades of the 19th century had seen the unprecedented prosperity of Polish culture and language in the former GDL lands, and had prepared the era of such famous Polish writers as Adam Mickiewicz and Władysław Syrokomla. The era had seen the effective completion of the Polonization of the lowest level of the nobility, the further reduction of the area of use of contemporary Belarusian, and the effective folklorization of Belarusian culture.

Due both to the state of the people's education and to the strong positions of Polish and Polonized nobility, it was only after the 1880s–1890s that the educated Belarusian element, still shunned because of "peasant origin", began to appear in state offices.

In 1846, ethnographer Pavel Shpilevskiy prepared a Belarusian grammar (using the Cyrillic alphabet) on the basis of the folk dialects of the Minsk region. However, the Russian Academy of Sciences refused to print his submission, on the basis that it had not been prepared in a sufficiently scientific manner.

From the mid-1830s ethnographic works began to appear, and tentative attempts to study the language were instigated (e.g. Shpilevskiy's grammar). The Belarusian literary tradition began to re-form, based on the folk language, initiated by the works of Vintsent Dunin-Martsinkyevich. See also: Jan Czeczot, Jan Barszczewski.

At the beginning of the 1860s, both the Russian and Polish parties in Belarusian lands had begun to realise that the decisive role in the upcoming conflicts was shifting to the peasantry, overwhelmingly Belarusian. So a large amount of propaganda appeared, targeted at the peasantry and written in Belarusian; notably, the anti-Russian, anti-Tsarist, anti-Eastern Orthodox "Manifesto" and the first newspaper Mużyckaja prauda (Peasants' Truth) (1862–1863) by Konstanty Kalinowski, and anti-Polish, anti-Revolutionary, pro-Orthodox booklets and poems (1862).

The advent of the all-Russian "narodniki" and Belarusian national movements (late 1870s–early 1880s) renewed interest in the Belarusian language (See also: Homan (1884), Bahushevich, Yefim Karskiy, Dovnar-Zapol'skiy, Bessonov, Pypin, Sheyn, Nasovič). The Belarusian literary tradition was also renewed (see also: F. Bahushevich). It was in these times that F. Bahushevich made his famous appeal to Belarusians: "Do not forsake our language, lest you pass away".

The first dictionary of the modern Belarusian language authored by Nasovič was published in 1870. In the editorial introduction to the dictionary, it is noted that:

“The Belarusian local tongue, which dominates a vast area from the Nioman and the Narew to the Upper Volga and from the Western Dvina to the Prypiac and the Ipuc and which is spoken by inhabitants of the North-Western and certain adjacent provinces, or those lands that were in the past settled by the Kryvic tribe, has long attracted the attention of our philologists because of those precious remains of the ancient [Ruthenian] language that survived in that tongue”.

According to the 1897 Russian Empire Census, about 5.89 million people declared themselves speakers of Belarusian (then known as White Russian).

The end of the 19th century, however, still showed that the urban language of Belarusian towns remained either Polish or Russian. The same census showed that towns with a population greater than 50,000 had fewer than a tenth Belarusian speakers. This state of affairs greatly contributed to a perception that Belarusian was a "rural" and "uneducated" language.

However, the census was a major breakthrough for the first steps of the Belarusian national self-awareness and identity, since it clearly showed to the Imperial authorities and the still-strong Polish minority that the population and the language were neither Polish nor Russian.

1900s–1910s 
The rising influence of Socialist ideas advanced the emancipation of the Belarusian language still further (see also: Belarusian Socialist Assembly, Circle of Belarusian People's Education and Belarusian Culture, Belarusian Socialist Lot, Socialist Party "White Russia", Alaiza Pashkievich, Nasha Dolya). The fundamental works of Yefim Karskiy marked a turning point in the scientific perception of Belarusian. The ban on publishing books and papers in Belarusian was officially removed (25 December 1904). The unprecedented surge of national feeling in the 20th century, especially among the workers and peasants, particularly after the events of 1905, gave momentum to the intensive development of Belarusian literature and press (See also: Naša niva, Yanka Kupala, Yakub Kolas).

Grammar 
During the 19th and early 20th century, there was no normative Belarusian grammar. Authors wrote as they saw fit, usually representing the particularities of different Belarusian dialects. The scientific groundwork for the introduction of a truly scientific and modern grammar of the Belarusian language was laid down by the linguist Yefim Karskiy.

By the early 1910s, the continuing lack of a codified Belarusian grammar was becoming intolerably obstructive in the opinion of uniformitarian prescriptivists. Then Russian academician Shakhmatov, chair of the Russian language and literature department of St. Petersburg University, approached the board of the Belarusian newspaper Naša niva with a proposal that a Belarusian linguist be trained under his supervision in order to be able to create documentation of the grammar. Initially, the famous Belarusian poet Maksim Bahdanovich was to be entrusted with this work. However, Bahdanovich's poor health (tuberculosis) precluded his living in the climate of St. Petersburg, so Branislaw Tarashkyevich, a fresh graduate of the Vilnya Liceum No. 2, was selected for the task.

In the Belarusian community, great interest was vested in this enterprise. The already famous Belarusian poet Yanka Kupala, in his letter to Tarashkyevich, urged him to "hurry with his much-needed work". Tarashkyevich had been working on the preparation of the grammar during 1912–1917, with the help and supervision of Shakhmatov and Karskiy. Tarashkyevich had completed the work by the autumn of 1917, even moving from the tumultuous Petrograd of 1917 to the relative calm of Finland in order to be able to complete it uninterrupted. 

By the summer of 1918, it became obvious that there were insurmountable problems with the printing of Tarashkyevich's grammar in Petrograd: a lack of paper, type and qualified personnel. Meanwhile, his grammar had apparently been planned to be adopted in the workers' and peasants' schools of Belarus that were to be set up, so Tarashkyevich was permitted to print his book abroad.  In June 1918, he arrived in Vilnius, via Finland. The Belarusian Committee petitioned the administration to allow the book to be printed. Finally, the first edition of the "Belarusian grammar for schools" was printed (Vil'nya, 1918).

There existed at least two other contemporary attempts at codifying the Belarusian grammar. In 1915, Rev. Balyaslaw Pachopka had prepared a Belarusian grammar using the Latin script. Belarusian linguist S. M. Nyekrashevich considered Pachopka's grammar unscientific and ignorant of the principles of the language. But Pachopka's grammar was reportedly taught in an unidentified number of schools, from 1918 for an unspecified period. Another grammar was supposedly jointly prepared by A. Lutskyevich and Ya. Stankyevich, and differed from Tarashkyevich's grammar somewhat in the resolution of some key aspects.

1914–1917 
On 22 December 1915, Paul von Hindenburg issued an order on schooling in German Army-occupied territories in the Russian Empire (Ober Ost), banning schooling in Russian and including the Belarusian language in an exclusive list of four languages made mandatory in the respective native schooling systems (Belarusian, Lithuanian, Polish, Yiddish). School attendance was not made mandatory, though. Passports at this time were bilingual, in German and in one of the "native languages". Also at this time, Belarusian preparatory schools, printing houses, press organs were opened (see also: Homan (1916)).

1917–1920 
After the 1917 February Revolution in Russia, the Belarusian language became an important factor in political activities in the Belarusian lands (see also: Central Council of Belarusian Organisations, Great Belarusian Council, First All-Belarusian Congress, Belnatskom). In the Belarusian People's Republic, Belarusian was used as the only official language (decreed by Belarusian People's Secretariat on 28 April 1918). Subsequently, in the Belarusian SSR, Belarusian was decreed to be one of the four (Belarusian, Polish, Russian, and Yiddish) official languages (decreed by Central Executive Committee of BSSR in February 1921).

1920–1930

Soviet Belarus 

A decree of 15 July 1924 confirmed that the Belarusian, Russian, Yiddish and Polish languages had equal status in Soviet Belarus.

In the BSSR, Tarashkyevich's grammar had been officially accepted for use in state schooling after its re-publication in unchanged form, first in 1922 by Yazep Lyosik under his own name as Practical grammar. Part I, then in 1923 by the Belarusian State Publishing House under the title Belarusian language. Grammar. Ed. I. 1923, also by "Ya. Lyosik".

In 1925, Lyosik added two new chapters, addressing the orthography of compound words and partly modifying the orthography of assimilated words. From this point on, Belarusian grammar had been popularized and taught in the educational system in that form. The ambiguous and insufficient development of several components of Tarashkyevich's grammar was perceived to be the cause of some problems in practical usage, and this led to discontent with the grammar.

In 1924–25, Lyosik and his brother Anton Lyosik prepared and published their project of orthographic reform, proposing a number of radical changes. A fully phonetic orthography was introduced.

The Belarusian Academic Conference on Reform of the Orthography and Alphabet was convened in 1926. After discussions on the project, the Conference made resolutions on some of the problems. However, the Lyosik brothers' project had not addressed all the problematic issues, so the Conference was not able to address all of those.

As the outcome of the conference, the Orthographic Commission was created to prepare the project of the actual reform. This was instigated on 1 October 1927, headed by S. Nyekrashevich, with the following principal guidelines of its work adopted:
 To consider the resolutions of the Belarusian Academic Conference (1926) non-mandatory, although highly competent material.
 To simplify Tarashkyevich's grammar where it was ambiguous or difficult in use, to amend it where it was insufficiently developed (e.g., orthography of assimilated words), and to create new rules if absent (orthography of proper names and geographical names).

During its work in 1927–29, the Commission had actually prepared the project for spelling reform. The resulting project had included both completely new rules and existing rules in unchanged and changed forms, some of the changes being the work of the Commission itself, and others resulting from the resolutions of the Belarusian Academic Conference (1926), re-approved by the Commission.

Notably, the use of the Ь (soft sign) before the combinations "consonant+iotified vowel" ("softened consonants"), which had been previously denounced as highly redundant (e.g., in the proceedings of the Belarusian Academic Conference (1926)), was cancelled. However, the complete resolution of the highly important issue of the orthography of unstressed Е (IE) was not achieved.

Both the resolutions of the Belarusian Academic Conference (1926) and the project of the Orthographic Commission (1930) caused much disagreement in the Belarusian academic environment. Several elements of the project were to be put under appeal in the "higher (political) bodies of power".

West Belarus 
In West Belarus, under Polish rule, the Belarusian language was at a disadvantage. Schooling in the Belarusian language was obstructed, and printing in Belarusian experienced political oppression.

The prestige of the Belarusian language in the Western Belarus during the period hinged significantly on the image of the BSSR being the "true Belarusian home". This image, however, was strongly disrupted by the "purges" of "national-democrats" in BSSR (1929–30) and by the subsequent grammar reform (1933).

Tarashkyevich's grammar was re-published five times in Western Belarus. However, the 5th edition (1929) (reprinted verbatim in Belarus in 1991 and often referred to) was the version diverging from the previously published one, which Tarashkyevich had prepared disregarding the Belarusian Academic Conference (1926) resolutions.

1930s

Soviet Belarus

In 1929–30, the Communist authorities of Soviet Belarus made a series of drastic crackdowns against the supposed "national-democratic counter-revolution" (informally "nats-dems"). Effectively, entire generations of Socialist Belarusian national activists in the first quarter of the 20th century were wiped out of political, scientific and social existence. Only the most famous cult figures (e.g. Yanka Kupala) were spared.

However, a new power group in Belarusian science quickly formed during these power shifts, under the virtual leadership of the Head of the Philosophy Institute of the Belarusian Academy of Sciences, academician S. Ya. Vol’fson. The book published under his editorship, Science in Service of Nats-Dems’ Counter-Revolution (1931), represented the new spirit of political life in Soviet Belarus.

1933 reform of Belarusian grammar
The Reform of Belarusian Grammar (1933) had been brought out quite unexpectedly, supposedly [Stank 1936], with the project published in the central newspaper of the Belarusian Communist Party (Zviazda) on 1933-06-28 and the decree of the Council of People's Commissars (Council of Ministers) of BSSR issued on 1933-08-28, to gain the status of law on 1933-09-16.

There had been some post-facto speculations, too, that the 1930 project of the reform (as prepared by people who were no longer seen as politically "clean"), had been given for the "purification" to the "nats-dems" competition in the Academy of Sciences, which would explain the "block" nature of the differences between the 1930 and 1933 versions. Peculiarly, Yan Stankyevich in his notable critique of the reform [Stank 1936] failed to mention the 1930 project, dating the reform project to 1932.

The reform resulted in the grammar officially used, with further amendments, in Byelorussian SSR and modern Belarus. Sometimes this grammar is called the official grammar of the Belarusian language, to distinguish it from the pre-reform grammar, known as the classic grammar or Taraškievica. It is also known as narkamauka, after the word narkamat, a Belarusian abbreviation for People's Commissariat (ministry). The latter term bears a derogatory connotation.

The officially announced causes for the reform were:
 The pre-1933 grammar was maintaining artificial barriers between the Russian and Belarusian languages.
 The reform was to cancel the influences of the Polonisation corrupting the Belarusian language.
 The reform was to remove the archaisms, neologisms and vulgarisms supposedly introduced by the "national-democrats".
 The reform was to simplify the grammar of the Belarusian language.

The reform had been accompanied by a fervent press campaign directed against the "nats-dems not yet giving up."

The decree had been named On Changing and Simplifying Belarusian Spelling, but the bulk of the changes had been introduced into the grammar. Yan Stankyevich in his critique of the reform talked about 25 changes, with one of them being strictly orthographical and 24 relating to both orthography and grammar. [Stank 1936]

Many of the changes in the orthography proper ("stronger principle of AH-ing," "no redundant soft sign," "uniform nye and byez") were, in fact, simply implementations of earlier proposals made by people who had subsequently suffered political suppression (e.g., Yazep Lyosik, Lastowski, Nyekrashevich, 1930 project). [Padluzhny 2004]

The morphological principle in the orthography had been strengthened, which also had been proposed in 1920s.

The "removal of the influences of the Polonisation" had been represented, effectively, by the:
 Reducing the use of the "consonant+non-iotified vowel" in assimilated Latinisms in favour of "consonant+iotified vowel," leaving only Д, Т, Р unexceptionally "hard."
 Changing the method of representing the sound "L" in Latinisms to another variant of the Belarusian sound Л (of 4 variants existing), rendered with succeeding non-iotified vowels instead of iotified.
 Introducing the new preferences of use of the letters Ф over Т for theta, and В over Б for beta, in Hellenisms. [Stank 1936]

The "removing of the artificial barriers between the Russian and Belarusian languages" (virtually the often-quoted "Russification of the Belarusian language", which may well happen to be a term coined by Yan Stankyevich) had, according to Stankyevich, moved the normative Belarusian morphology and syntax closer to their Russian counterparts, often removing from use the indigenous features of the Belarusian language. [Stank 1936]

Stankyevich also observed that some components of the reform had moved the Belarusian grammar to the grammars of other Slavonic languages, which would hardly be its goal. [Stank 1936]

West Belarus
In West Belarus, there had been some voices raised against the reform, chiefly by the non-Communist/non-socialist wing of the Belarusian national scene. Yan Stankyevich was named to the Belarusian Scientific Society, Belarusian National Committee and Society of the Friends of Belarusian Linguistics at Wilno University. Certain political and scientific groups and figures went on using the pre-reform orthography and grammar, however, thus multiplying and differing versions.

However, the reformed grammar and orthography had been used, too, for example during the process of Siarhei Prytytski in 1936.

Second World War

During the Occupation of Belarus by Nazi Germany (1941–1944), the Belarusian collaborationists influenced newspapers and schools to use the Belarusian language. This variant did not use any of the post-1933 changes in vocabulary, orthography and grammar. Much publishing in Belarusian Latin script was done. In general, in the publications of the Soviet partisan movement in Belarus, the normative 1934 grammar was used.

Post Second World War 

After the Second World War, several major factors influenced the development of the Belarusian language. The most important was the implementation of the "rapprochement and unification of Soviet people" policy, which resulted by the 1980s in the Russian language effectively and officially assuming the role of the principal means of communication, with Belarusian relegated to a secondary role. The post-war growth in the number of publications in the Belarusian language in BSSR drastically lagged behind those in Russian. The use of Belarusian as the main language of education was gradually limited to rural schools and humanitarian faculties. The BSSR counterpart of the USSR law "On strengthening of ties between school and real life and on the further development of popular education in the USSR" (1958), adopted in 1959, along with introduction of a mandatory 8-year school education, made it possible for the parents of pupils to opt for non-mandatory studying of the "second language of instruction," which would be Belarusian in a Russian language school and vice versa. However, for example in the 1955/56 school year, there were 95% of schools with Russian as the primary language of instruction, and 5% with Belarusian as the primary language of instruction.

That was the source of concern for the nationally minded and caused, for example, the series of publications by Barys Sachanka in 1957–61 and the text named "Letter to a Russian Friend" by Alyaksyey Kawka (1979). The BSSR Communist party leader Kirill Mazurov made some tentative moves to strengthen the role of Belarusian language in the second half of the 1950s.

After the beginning of Perestroika and the relaxing of political control in the late 1980s, a new campaign in support of the Belarusian language was mounted in BSSR, expressed in the "Letter of 58" and other publications, producing a certain level of popular support and resulting in the BSSR Supreme Soviet ratifying the "Law on Languages" (""; 26 January 1990) requiring the strengthening of the role of Belarusian in state and civic structures.

1959 reform of grammar 

A discussion on problems in Belarusian orthography and on the further development of the language was held from 1935–1941. From 1949–1957 this continued, although it was deemed there was a need to amend some unwarranted changes to the 1933 reform. The Orthography Commission, headed by Yakub Kolas, set up the project in about 1951, but it was approved only in 1957, and the normative rules were published in 1959. These rules had been accepted as normative for the Belarusian language since then, receiving minor practical changes in the 1985 edition.

A project to correct parts of the 1959 rules was conducted from 2006 to 2007.

Post-1991 
The process of government support for "Belarusization" began even before the breakup of the Soviet Union, with the Supreme Soviet of the BSSR passing a law on languages in 1990 that aimed for the gradual increase in prestige and general use of the Belarusian language over the next 10 years, followed by the creation that same year of a National Language Program to support this endeavor. After Belarus became independent in 1991, support for the cause of the Belarusian language gained prestige and popular interest, with the post-Soviet Belarusian government the continued creation of policies to actively promote the use of the Belarusian language, especially in education. The creation of the 1994 Constitution declared Belarusian to be the sole official language, though Russian was given the status as "language of inter-ethnic communication". However, the implementation of the 1992–94 "Law on Languages" took place in such a way that it provoked public protests and was dubbed "Landslide Belarusization" and "undemocratic" by those opposing it in 1992–94.

In a controversial referendum held on 14 May 1995 the Belarusian language lost its exclusive status as the only state language. State support for Belarusian language and culture in general has dwindled since then, and Russian is dominant in everyday life in today's Belarus. In a 2006 article, Roy Medvedev compared the position of the Belarusian language in Belarus with that of the Irish language in the Republic of Ireland. Adam Maldzis considers that one of typological similarities is the official bilinguism both in Belarus and Ireland, and the low real status of the mother-tongue.

A spelling reform of the official Belarusian language, making the spelling of some words more similar to Taraškievič's system, was decided on July 23, 2008, and went into effect on September 1, 2010.

Discrimination against Belarusian speakers
Under the regime of Belarus's current president, Alexander Lukashenko, members of the Belarusian speaking minority in Belarus have complained about the discrimination against the Belarusian language in Belarus.

Despite a formally equal status of Russian and Belarusian, Russian is primarily used by the Belarusian government, and cases of discrimination against the Belarusian language are not rare, even though the discrimination is not institutionalized. Authorities occasionally make minor concessions to demands for a widening of the usage of the Belarusian language.

Organisations promoting Belarusian language such as the Frantsishak Skaryna Belarusian Language Society were reported as being the object of attacks by Belarus-based Russian neo-Nazi groups in the 1990s and 2000s.

The Frantsishak Skaryna Belarusian Language Society has reported about the following categories of violations against the rights of Belarusian speakers in Belarus:

 The right to receive public and private services in the Belarusian language;
 The right to access legislation in the Belarusian language;
 The right to receive education in the Belarusian language;
 The right to an equitable presence of the Belarusian language in the media;
 The right to receive full oral and written information in the Belarusian language on the products and services proposed by commercial companies.

Belarusian speakers are facing numerous obstacles when trying to arrange Belarusian language education for their children.  there are no Belarusian-language universities in the country.

In its 2016 human rights in Belarus report, the US State Department also stated that there was "discrimination against ... those who sought to use the Belarusian language." "Because the government viewed many proponents of the Belarusian language as political opponents, authorities continued to harass and intimidate academic and cultural groups that sought to promote Belarusian and routinely rejected proposals to widen use of the language,".

2010s 
In the 2010s, the situation of Belarusian has started to change slightly due to the efforts of language-advocacy institutions, of individual representatives of such educational, cultural, scientific and linguistic organizations as the Frantsishak Skaryna Belarusian Language Society, the Belarus Academy of Sciences, the Belarusian Writers' Union, and in response to the endeavours of pro-Belarusian public figures from the media and communication field, musicians, philosophers, entrepreneurs and benefactors.

Despite the language losing its exclusive position in the wake of the 1995 Belarusian referendum, new signs of the spread of Belarusian have appeared, trickling down into Belarusian society — with advertising campaigns supporting the cause (outdoor billboards promoting and acquainting people with the Belarusian language, branding campaigns for the leading telecommunication providers like Velcom, etc.), the simplified version of the Belarusian Latin alphabet on the metro map being introduced into the messages of the transport network, dedicated advertising festivals like AD!NAK upholding marketing communication in Belarusian, and informal language-courses (such as Mova Nanova, Mova ci kava, Movavedy) having sprung up in Minsk and around Belarus and spurring further interest of people, especially of young people, in developing good Belarusian communication skills in everyday life.

President Lukashenko, in his 2014 State of the Nation address, emphasized that losing the ability to speak Belarusian will be losing a part of the country's history.

There exists an alternative literary norm of the Belarusian language, named . Generally Taraškievica favors Polish-inspired pronunciations (плян, філязофія) while regular Belarusian follows Russian-inspired pronunciations (план, філасофія). Taraškievica also features a more phonetic spelling system, particularly using a separate letter for the [ɡ] sound, which is argued to be an allophone of [ɣ] rather than a phoneme.

Computer representation 
Belarusian is represented by the ISO 639 code be or bel, or more specifically by IETF language tags be-1959acad (so-called "Academic" ["governmental"] variant of Belarusian as codified in 1959) or be-tarask (Belarusian in Taraskievica orthography).

See also
 Languages of Belarus
 Belarusian orthography reform of 1933
 Old Ruthenian language
 East Slavic languages
 Kievan Rus'
 Ruthenia
 Narkamauka
 Russification of Belarus
 Trasianka, a blend of Russian and Belarusian languages spoken by many in Belarus

Notes

References

  In edition:  (T.1), 
 
 [Lyosik 1917] 
 [Stank 1939] 
 [Zhur 1978] 
 [Halyen 1988] 
 [AniZhur 1988]

Further reading
 Кalita I. V. Современная Беларусь: языки и национальная идентичность. Ústí nad Labem, 2010, 300 s. s. 112–190.
Mayo P. (1993). "Belorussian." In Comrie B. & Corbett G. (eds.) The Slavonic languages. London & New York: Routledge. p. 887–946. 
McMillin A. (1980). "Belorussian." In Schenker A. & Stankiewicz E. (eds.) The Slavic literary languages, formation and development. New Haven: Yale Concilium on International and Area Studies. p. 105–117. 
Wexler P. (1977). A historical phonology of the Belorussian language. Heidelberg: C. Winter. 
Pashkievich V. (1974). Fundamental Byelorussian — Беларуская мова. Books 1,2. Toronto.

External links

 Belarusian Swadesh list of basic vocabulary words (from Wiktionary's Swadesh list appendix)
 English–Belarusian dictionaries, in Lacinka
 Metrica of GDL
 Statutes of GDL
  Belarusian language
 Fundamentals of Modern Belarusian
 Belarusian–English Dictionary from Webster's Online Dictionary – The Rosetta Edition
 English-Belarusian dictionary
 English–Belarusian online dictionary
 Composition of the population of Belarus
 Are The Belarusian And Russian Languages Very Similar?

Examples of Belarusian-language media
The following are examples of independent Belarusian-language print and television news media for students interested in learning Belarusian language by reading current news articles and watching television news programs in Belarusian in order to practice reading and listening comprehension. (The following two examples are independent Belarusian-language news organizations that happen to be based in Poland; currently  news organizations based in Belarus are tightly controlled by the State and have limited journalistic independence.)
 Charter 97 — Independent print (online) news source based in Warsaw, with translations of all articles in triplicate—in Belarusian, Russian, and English—particularly useful for native English speakers studying Belarusian and for comparing and contrasting Belarusian and Russian
 Belsat News YouTube channel — Independent television (also online) news source broadcasting in Belarusian

 
Languages of Belarus
Languages of Estonia
Languages of Latvia
Languages of Lithuania
Languages of Poland
Languages of Russia
Ruthenian language
East Slavic languages
Languages written in Cyrillic script